Panagaeus cruxmajor, the crucifix ground beetle, is a rare European ground beetle. In England it occurs in a few places only. Panagaeus bipustulatus is a commoner relative, looking very much alike except for being smaller. The crucifix ground beetle is sometimes included in P. bipustulatus, but most modern authors consider it distinct.

It shelters under pieces of wood during the day, and is a nocturnal predatory species thought to mainly feed on semi-aquatic snails.

It was greatly treasured by 19th century collectors, and Charles Darwin recounted an incident when he was an undergraduate at the University of Cambridge around 1828. He had already collected two ground beetles when he "saw a sacred Panagæus crux major". He tried putting one of the other beetles in his mouth to free his hand, but it ejected acrid fluid down his throat, causing him to spit it out and lose all three.

References

Letter 1009 — C. R. Darwin to Leonard Jenyns, 17 Oct (1846)

External links

Panagaeinae
Beetles of Europe
Beetles described in 1758
Taxa named by Carl Linnaeus